George Eugene Palmer (22 February 1859 – 22 August 1910) also known as Eugene Palmer and Joey Palmer, was an Australian cricketer who played in 17 Test matches between 1880 and 1886.

After returning from the 1886 tour to England he damaged his knee and never played Test cricket again but came to play first class cricket in Australia until the end of 1896/97.

Palmer was also a leading Australian rules footballer for South Melbourne Football Club in the Victorian Football Association (VFA).

Family
He married Lucinda Ann Blackham, daughter of Frederic Keane Blackham and Lucinda Ann (née McCarthy), in 1888. His brother-in-law was his Test teammate Jack Blackham.

References

Sources

 Atkinson, G. (1982) Everything you ever wanted to know about Australian rules football but couldn't be bothered asking, The Five Mile Press: Melbourne. 
Cricinfo article on Joey Palmer

1859 births
1910 deaths
Australia Test cricketers
Tasmania cricketers
Victoria cricketers
Australian cricketers
South Melbourne Football Club (VFA) players
Australian rules footballers from New South Wales
Cricketers from New South Wales